Saint-Mathieu-d'Harricana is a municipality in the Canadian province of Quebec, located in the Abitibi Regional County Municipality. It is part of the census agglomeration of Amos.

Demographics
The municipality had a population of 739 as of the 2016 Canadian Census.

As of the 2006 census, mother tongues spoken are:
 English as first language: 0%
 French as first language: 100%
 English and French as first language: 0%
 Other as first language: 0%

Population trend:
 Population in 2016: 739 (2011 to 2016 population change: 6.2%)
 Population in 2011: 696 (2006 to 2011 population change: -2.8%)
 Population in 2006: 716
 Population in 2001: 700
 Population in 1996: 717
 Population in 1991: 655

Municipal council
 Mayor: Martin Roch
 Councillors: Lucie Crépeault-Offroy, Gabriel Lemay, Félix Offroy, Érix Pomerleau, Simon Roy, Simon Simard

References

Municipalities in Quebec
Incorporated places in Abitibi-Témiscamingue